The Dr. Nicolae Minovici Folk Art Museum is a museum located at 1 Dr. Nicolae Minovici Street in the Băneasa district of Bucharest, Romania.

Initially built as a retreat on the city outskirts for Nicolae Minovici between 1906 and 1907, the house evolved into Bucharest's first folk art museum, with an expansive collection of ethnographic displays. The building was designed by the owner's friend, Cristofi Cerchez, in the Romanian Revival style.

The museum building is listed as a historic monument by Romania's Ministry of Culture and Religious Affairs.

Notes

External links
Official site

 

Historic monuments in Bucharest
Folk art museums and galleries
Neo-Brâncovenesc architecture
Art museums established in 1906
Houses completed in 1905
Art museums and galleries in Bucharest
Băneasa